Boris Popović (born 26 February 2000) is a professional footballer who plays as a defender for Belgian First Division A club Cercle Brugge. Born in France, he is a youth international for Serbia.

Career

Monaco
In 2017, Popović signed for the reserves of French Ligue 1 side Monaco from Tours B in the French fifth division.

Cercle Brugge
In 2021, he signed with Belgian club Cercle Brugge. On 27 July 2021, he made his debut for Cercle in a 1–0 win over Beerschot, coming on as a substitute for the injured Senna Miangué. On 21 August, he scored his first goal in a 2–1 loss away against Seraing after a poor clearance.

References

External links
 
 
 

2000 births
Living people
Sportspeople from Tours, France
Serbian footballers
Serbia under-21 international footballers
Serbia youth international footballers
French footballers
French people of Serbian descent
Tours FC players
AS Monaco FC players
Cercle Brugge K.S.V. players
Belgian Pro League players
Association football defenders
Championnat National 3 players
Serbian expatriate footballers
Serbian expatriate sportspeople in Belgium
Serbian expatriate sportspeople in Monaco
French expatriate footballers
French expatriate sportspeople in Belgium
French expatriate sportspeople in Monaco
Expatriate footballers in Belgium
Expatriate footballers in Monaco